Cranford is an unincorporated community in southern Alberta in the Municipal District of Taber, located on Highway 3,  east of Lethbridge.

Localities in the Municipal District of Taber